The Abryanz Style and Fashion Awards 2017 was held on 8 December 2017 at the Kampala Serena Hotel themed the Fashion Takeover, celebrating the business and entrepreneurial potential of the fashion industry in Africa. The awards were presented by the ‘’’Abryanz franchise’’’ with an aim of honoring and celebrate excellence of Africa’s growing fashion industry. The event was hosted by Rachel K and Nana Akua and produced by South Africas's David Tlale.

Nominations for the 2017 ASFAs started on 7 September until 6 October. Nominees were unveiled in a video presented by Abryanz Collection and ASFAs CEO Brian Ahumuza, TV presenter Bettinah Tianah and model scout Joram Muzira.

Acts
Musicians Mafikizolo, Eddy Kenzo, Desire Luzinda, Fik Fameica, Gravity Omutujju,  Latinum and Sheebah performed at the event. Mafikizolo performed their hit songs including Wepuuti, Koona and closed their performance with their new release Love Potion which won Most Stylish Video of The Year award on the same night. The highlight of the event was the Lifetime/Style Fashion Icon Achievement Award which was presented to Nigerian tailor and fashion designer Mai Atafo.

Nominees and winners
Winners are highlighted and bolded.

See also
 Abryanz Style and Fashion Awards (ASFAs)

References

Fashion awards
Award ceremonies